Alice Eduardo is a Filipino businesswoman. She is the founder, president, and chief executive officer (CEO) of Sta. Elena Construction and Development Corporation.

Early life 
Eduardo is the eldest of four siblings  to parents Eduardo and Elisa Galang, who were a dentist and certified public accountant, respectively. Her family owned a garments export business in Manila, a rice milling business in Bocaue, Bulacan and a rice trading business in Nueva Ecija. The family also owned a bowling center.

She managed these activities until she formed her own company in 1995, the "Sta. Elena Construction and Development Corporation". This was a stepping stone to entering the construction industry. She started with four sets of cranes that she rented until she bagged a partnership with a Japanese construction firm. Her company, Sta. Elena Construction, was subcontracted to build the foundation for a power plant in Batangas.

Before Eduardo even became a young entrepreneur, she was drawn to properties. She bought her first condominium in Ortigas while in college.

Eduardo has drawn recognition for her business achievements, including being named one of Go Negosyo's 50 Inspiring Women of Passion.

Philanthropy 

Alice is also one of PeopleAsia's People of the Year 2017 awardees. In December 2018, she was honored as one of Forbes Asia's Heroes of Philanthropy 2018.

Eduardo partly funded a pediatric ward in Philippine General Hospital (PGH). The isolation ward facility was inaugurated on February 18, 2015.

Alice Eduardo also funds building houses for the underprivileged through Habitat for Humanity, donates to the Philippine Red Cross, and supports programs of the Caritas Manila.

References

External links 
 
 
 Professional Site of Ms. Alice Eduardo

Living people
Filipino women in business
Filipino company founders
People from Nueva Ecija
University of Santo Tomas alumni
Year of birth missing (living people)